Abertafol railway station was a halt located on the north shore of the Dyfi estuary in the old Welsh county of Merionethshire (south Gwynedd).

History

Opened by the Great Western Railway on 18 March 1935 and originally named Abertafol Halt, the station passed on to the London Midland Region of British Railways on nationalisation in 1948. Renamed Abertafol on 6 May 1968, services were suspended from 14 May 1984 due to the deteriorating structural condition of the platform and cost of repairs needed. The station was officially closed by the British Railways Board on 30 September 1985.

The site today

Trains on the Cambrian Line pass the site of the former halt.
There are no remains of the wooden platform to be seen today. Only the access steps down the cliff from the A493 road are left.

Notes

References

External links
Station on navigable O. S. map

Disused railway stations in Gwynedd
Former Great Western Railway stations
Railway stations in Great Britain opened in 1935
Railway stations in Great Britain closed in 1985
Aberdyfi